Warren Stoman (born 5 April 1995) is a South African cricketer. He made his List A debut for Western Province in the 2016–17 CSA Provincial One-Day Challenge on 31 October 2016.

References

External links
 

1995 births
Living people
South African cricketers
Western Province cricketers
Place of birth missing (living people)